Uniondale or Union Dale may refer to:

In South Africa:
 Uniondale, Western Cape, a small town in South Africa

In the United States:
 Union Dale, Pennsylvania, a borough in Susquehanna County
 Uniondale, Indiana, a town in Wells County
 Uniondale, New York, a hamlet and census-designated place in Nassau County